Habib Saeed Zabalawi is a Jordanian journalist who works at BeIN Sports since 2013 and a FIFA Players Agent Since 2010.

Professional career

 Abu Dhabi Sports – Producer (November 2008 - December 2012)
 Jordan Broadcasting Television (ATV) – Senior Producer / Presenter (August 2006-November 2007)
 Arab Radio And Television (ART) - International Sport Reporter (March 2005-August 2006)
 Al Arabiya Satellite Channel (MBC Group) – Sport Correspondent (February 2003-March 2005)
 Jordan Motorsport – Official Announcer And Commentator In Jordan (Jordan International Rally - Jordan National Rally)(February 2007-August 2008)
 Super Sport Magazine - Sports Reporter In Jordan (January 2004-August 2008)

Awards
 Best Arab Sports Reporter For The Year 2004 And The Year 2005 And 2006.
 Prize From Princess Sumayya Bint Al Hassan For Being The Best Sports Reporter In Jordan (2004)
 The  Best Coverage  For  F1 Races Between All right Holders Channels  In 2010 By FIA.

References

People from Amman
Jordanian journalists
Living people
Year of birth missing (living people)